27 Monocerotis is a single star located about 318 light years away from the Sun star in the equatorial constellation of Monoceros. It is visible to the naked eye as a faint, orange-hued star with an apparent visual magnitude of 4.93. The star is advancing toward the Earth with a heliocentric radial velocity of −28 km/s.

This object is an aging giant star, most likely (94% chance) on the red giant branch, with a stellar classification of K2III. Having exhausted the hydrogen at its core, the star has evolved off the main sequence and expanded to over 13 times the girth of the Sun. It is around four billion years old with 1.3 times the Sun's mass. The star is radiating 148 times the Sun's luminosity from its swollen photosphere at an effective temperature of 4,568 K.

References

K-type giants
Monoceros (constellation)
BD-03 2157
Monocerotis, 27
065695
039079
3122